Ukraine's 9th electoral district is a Verkhovna Rada constituency in the Autonomous Republic of Crimea. Established in its current form in 2012, it includes the cities of Armiansk and Krasnoperekopsk, as well as Chornomorske Raion, Krasnoperekopsk Raion, Pervomaiske Raion, and Rozdolne Raion. The constituency is home to 144,121 registered voters, and has 151 polling stations. Since the Annexation of Crimea by the Russian Federation in 2014, the seat has been vacant.

The constituency is surrounded by the 4th district to the south, the 3rd district to the east, the Karkinit Bay to the north, and the Black Sea to the west.

Members of Parliament

Elections

2012

See also
Electoral districts of Ukraine
Foreign electoral district of Ukraine

References

Electoral districts of Ukraine
Constituencies established in 2012